The EuroDeaf 2011, short for the 2011 European Deaf Football Championships, was the seventh edition of the European competition of deaf football national teams for men, and the first edition for women. It was organized by the European Deaf Sport Organization (EDSO). The championship for men was held in Odense, Denmark between 27 June - 9 July, and the women's championship took place in Albena, Bulgaria between 6–11 June.  12 men's national teams, and 3 women's national teams competed. In the men's championship, Russia won the title for the first time, defeating Ukraine in the final, Germany placed third. In the women's championship, Russia won the title for the first time, defeating Germany in the final, Great Britain placed third.

Participating nations
Men

Women

References

2011
2011
2011
2011 in disability sport
2011 in association football
June 2011 sports events in Europe
July 2011 sports events in Europe
2011–12 in Danish football
2011–12 in Bulgarian football
2011–12 in European football
June 2011 sports events in Denmark
July 2011 sports events in Denmark
June 2011 sports events in Bulgaria
Sport in Odense
Sport in Albena